Harland may refer to:

Harland (name)
Parker Boudreaux, an American professional wrestler who once wrestled in NXT under the ring name "Harland"

Organizations
 Harland and Wolff, a British heavy engineering company specializing in shipbuilding and bridge construction
 Harland & Wolff Welders F.C., a Northern Irish football club
 John H. Harland Company, a USA-based Check printing company

Places
Harland Hand Memorial Garden, San Francisco Botanical Garden

Ships

See also
 Harlan